The Topeka shiner (Notropis topeka) is a North American species of cyprinid  freshwater fish.
The Topeka shiner is a type of minnow that does not grow longer than a few inches. This minnow is a shiny silver color its main physical characteristic is the black colored stripe that runs along the side of the body.

It is distributed in  the Mississippi River basin, from southern Minnesota and southeastern South Dakota south to central Missouri and southern Kansas.

The Topeka shiner lives mainly in prairie streams. In order for the Topeka shiner to survive the water must be cold and clear. The streams in which this Minnow lives are typically consistent and run year long. In cases in which the stream does dry up, the Topeka Shiner needs to find a new stream or permanent body of water to survive.

The Topeka shiner was listed as Endangered by the U.S. Fish and Wildlife Service in 1998.  The species is endangered primarily because of the water quality need. This species relies on clean water to survive. When the streams water quality changes the Topeka shiner has difficulty adjusting to the changes. The water quality can change due to both environmental and human impact. A main cause for the decline in population is human activity. The water quality changes and the minnow are impacted when natural plant life is taken away.  Any type of construction such as road work, new homes and other types of development can affect the habitat in which the Topeka shiner lives.

References

 USFWS Fact Sheet 
 Iowa Dept. Agriculture and Land Stewardship
 Robert Jay Goldstein, Rodney W. Harper, Richard Edwards: American Aquarium Fishes. Texas A&M University Press 2000, p. 95

Topeka shiner
Endemic fauna of the United States
Fish of the Eastern United States
Freshwater fish of the United States
Fauna of the Plains-Midwest (United States)
Natural history of Kansas
Topeka shiner
Taxa named by Charles Henry Gilbert